Marionette is a 1939 Italian comedy film directed by Carmine Gallone and starring Beniamino Gigli, Carla Rust and Lucie Englisch. It featured the onscreen debut of Marcello Mastroianni as an uncredited extra.

Produced by the Italian-German company Itala Film, it was shot at the Cinecittà Studios in Rome. The film's sets were designed by the art director Guido Fiorini. A separate German version Dir gehört mein Herz was also made.

Cast
 Beniamino Gigli as Il tenore Mario Rossi
 Carla Rust as Gloria Bakermann
 Lucie Englisch as Nannina, la falsa contessa Veranuzzi
 Paul Kemp as Rico
 Theo Lingen as Luigi
 Richard Romanowsky as Il maestro Galli
 Romolo Costa as Frank Davis
 Guglielmo Barnabò as Un contadino
 Nicola Maldacea as Uno stalliere
 Rio Nobile as Bellini
 Dina Romano as Emilia, una contadina
 Heinz Salfner as Lo zio di Gloria
 Friedrich Ettel as Astori, l'impresario
 Erich Kestin as Francesco, il maggiordomo
 Marcello Mastroianni as Extra

References

Bibliography
 Donald Dewey. Marcello Mastroianni: His Life and Art. Carol Publishing Group, 1993.

External links

1939 films
Italian comedy films
1930s Italian-language films
1939 comedy films
Italian black-and-white films
Films directed by Carmine Gallone
Italian multilingual films
Films shot at Cinecittà Studios
1939 multilingual films